Leapin' Leprechauns! is a 1995 direct-to-video American film, starring Andrew Smith, John Bluthal and Ray Bright. It was directed by Ted Nicolaou.

Plot
A man tries to prevent the building of a theme park on top of a land that is home to the Leprechauns.

Cast
 John Bluthal as Michael Dennehy
 Grant Cramer as John Dennehy
 Sharon Lee Jones as Sarah Dennehy
 Gregory Smith as Mikey Dennehy
 Erica Hess as Melanie Dennehy
 James Ellis as Patrick
 Sylvester McCoy as Flynn
 Godfrey James as King Kevin, of the leprechauns
 Tina Martin as Queen Maeve, of the fairies
 Andrew Smith as Andrew
 Ray Bright as Andrew's Father
 Madeleine Potter as Morgan de la Fey/Nula (uncredited)

Production
The movie was filmed back-to-back with its sequel Spellbreaker: Secret of the Leprechauns (1996). It was filmed mostly in Romania.

Reception
Leapin' Leprechauns received mostly unfavorable reviews from critics. The lack of a clear storyline and an "all-out villain" were appointed by many experts as critique points. Felix Vasquez from Cinema Crazed stated: Leapin' Leprechauns! "is not the worst movie I’ve ever seen, but it’s probably the most baffling I’ve seen in a good while. The film takes literally a half hour to get the actual plot in motion, and we spend about twenty long minutes on a leprechaun council meeting where the leprechauns and fairies argue and bicker non-stop. As for a villain of the piece, we don’t meet the evil menace until there’s only ten minutes left in the actual movie. I couldn’t understand why the villain was introduced before the credits actually began, but the writers fails to muster up an interesting bad guy". For MonsterHunt "Leapin' Leprechauns! is as unambitious as the leprechauns’ use of their magic powers and so pedestrian in every thing it attempts that if old King Kevin popped out of my garbage giving me three wishes, my first wish would be that I never saw or heard of this movie. My second wish would be the same just as a backup in case for some reason the first wish failed. And my third wish? Talking dog. Duh. I’m not wasting them all!". TV Guide was optimistic with the lack of an "all-out villain ", but criticized the poor visual effects: "The lack of an all-out villain makes LEAPIN' LEPRECHAUNS! a nice change from the usual routine of live-action family films, though cut-rate special effects limit the title figures in their interaction with other characters".

Sequels
A sequel called Spellbreaker: Secret of the Leprechauns was released direct-to-video in 1996.

References

External links
 
 
 

1995 films
American direct-to-video films
Paramount Pictures direct-to-video films
Full Moon Features films
1990s English-language films
Films directed by Ted Nicolaou